Because This Is My First Life is a 2017 South Korean television series starring Lee Min-ki and Jung So-min that explores different points of view on careers, relationships, marriage, and love. The series marks Lee Min-ki's first small screen lead role since 2007. It aired from October 9 to November 28, 2017 on tvN's Mondays and Tuesdays at 21:30 (KST) time slot.

Synopsis
IT employee and socially awkward Nam Se-hee (Lee Min-ki) marries broke, homeless writer Yoon Ji-ho (Jung So-min) by signing a contract of two years. Both parties agree to the terms and conditions of being just landlord and tenant. They plan to share their home based on common goals and values, safe from mutual attraction. Things do not go as planned when the housemates fall prey to their personal trauma, social expectations, and familial interventions.

The series also follows the lives of Se-hee and Ji-ho's friends and their different perspectives on love and marriage.

Cast

Main
 Lee Min-ki as Nam Se-hee, a quirky and apathetic computer designer who has bought an expensive townhouse and rents out his extra room to help with the mortgage. He spends his days at work or home with his cat and has no plans to date or marry. After a series of bad tenants, he rates Ji-ho very highly and, believing she is a male, he offers her the room.
 Jung So-min as Yoon Ji-ho, an assistant screenwriter who moves out of the home she shares with her brother when he marries his pregnant girlfriend. Currently between projects, she rents the room from Se-hee (who she thinks is female) because the rent is affordable and no deposit is required. After working hard at her career throughout her twenties, at age 30 she has never dated and has a career crisis that causes her to rethink her goals.

Supporting
 Esom as Woo Su-ji, a school friend of Ji-ho who works in a corporate office. Her dream was to be the CEO of her own business but she is trapped in a well-paying position where she must bear with frequent sexual harassment from her male colleagues.
 Park Byung-eun as Ma Sang-goo, friends with Se-hee since college and CEO of the company where Se-hee works.
 Kim Ga-eun as Yang Ho-rang, a school friend of Ji-ho who is a hostess at a restaurant/bar and dreams of becoming a wife and mother.
 Kim Min-seok as Sim Won-seok, Ho-rang's long-time boyfriend who is the CEO of a startup company which is having problems getting an investor.

People around Nam Se-hee
 Kim Eung-soo as Nam Hee-bong, Se-hee's father who is a former high school principal.
 Moon Hee-kyung as Jo Myung-ji, Se-hee's mother who is a full-time housewife.

People around Yoon Ji-ho
 Kim Byeong-ok as Yoon Jong-soo, Ji-ho's father who is a car center operator.
 Kim Sun-young as Kim Hyun-ja, Ji-ho's mother who is a full-time housewife.
 Noh Jong-hyun as Yoon Ji-suk, Ji-ho's younger brother.
 Jeon Hye-won as Lee Eun-sol, Ji-suk's pregnant wife.

Extended
 Kim Min-kyu as Yeon Bok-nam, a colleague of Ji-ho’s.
 Lee Chung-ah as Go Jung-min, Se-hee's ex-girlfriend, a successful businesswoman.
 Yoon Bo-mi as Yoon Bo-mi, a data analyst who works with Se-hee.
 Hwang Seok-jeong as Writer Hwang.

Special appearances
 Yoon Doo-joon (Episode 1)
 Yoon So-hee (Episode 1)
 Kim Wook as a director

Production
The series is directed by Park Joon-hwa, and written by Yoon Nan-joong. The first script reading session of the cast took place on August 25, 2017 at Studio Dragon in Sangam-dong.

Original soundtrack

Part 1

Part 2

Part 3

Part 4

Part 5

Part 6

Part 7

Part 8

Commercial performance

Ratings

Awards and nominations

References

External links
  
 
 

Korean-language television shows
TVN (South Korean TV channel) television dramas
2017 South Korean television series debuts
2017 South Korean television series endings
South Korean romantic comedy television series
Television series by Studio Dragon